Alexander John McTaggart (born 24 January 1949) is an Australian politician who was an independent member of the New South Wales Legislative Assembly for Pittwater between 2005 and 2007. At the time of his election, McTaggart was also the Mayor of Pittwater Council.

Early life
Alex McTaggart grew up in the Pittwater area of Sydney, attending Avalon Public School and then St Paul's Catholic College in Manly, before finishing with his Leaving Certificate and then gaining an Associate Diploma of Teaching (Technical) as well as horticulture and landscape design qualifications.

Political career
Following the sudden resignation of John Brogden as Liberal Opposition Leader and his subsequent resignation from Parliament, McTaggart was elected to the Legislative Assembly in a 2005 by-election for Pittwater in what many considered as a shock result. The Liberals lost over 22 percent of their primary vote from 2003, allowing McTaggart to win with 55 percent of the two-party vote.

His victory was cited as a "disastrous loss" for the Liberal Party in a seat it had held for 32 years. McTaggart attributed his election win to his opposition to the television show Baywatch being filmed at Avalon Beach. In 1999, McTaggart had been a protester against a proposal for Baywatch to film permanently at the beach.

McTaggart was defeated in the 2007 state election, with Pittwater returning to the Liberal Party's Rob Stokes. McTaggart continued to serve on Pittwater Council as a North Ward Councillor, for which he was first elected in September 1999, until its amalgamation into the Northern Beaches Council on 12 May 2016.

Northern Beaches Council
On 12 May 2016, with the release of the Local Government (Council Amalgamations) Proclamation 2016, the Northern Beaches Council was formed as per Warringah's submission, from Manly, Pittwater and Warringah councils. McTaggart was then named by Northern Beaches Administrator Dick Persson as a member of the Implementation Advisory Group, one of several advisory committees composed of former councillors and mayors of the three councils.

McTaggart then stood as an independent candidate for Pittwater Ward of the Northern Beaches Council and was elected in the second ward position on 9 September 2017. He unsuccessfully stood for re-election to this position at the following election held on 4 December 2021, being excluded on the 11th preference count after receiving 12.68% (0.5 of a quota) of the first preference vote in Pittwater Ward.

References 

1949 births
Living people
Mayors of places in New South Wales
Members of the New South Wales Legislative Assembly
Independent members of the Parliament of New South Wales
21st-century Australian politicians